Alan Axelrod (born 1952) is a prolific author of history, business and management books. As of October 2018, he had written more than 150 books. Axelrod resides in Atlanta, Georgia.

Axelrod received his doctorate in English from the University of Iowa in 1979, specializing in the literature and culture of colonial America and the early republic of the United States. He has taught at Lake Forest College and Furman University, worked as a publishing executive, and has been a consultant to historical museums, cultural institutions, television's Civil War Journal, the WB Network, and the Discovery Channel.

Press interviews and quotations 

In Inc. magazine, in 2004, Mike Hofman interviewed Alan Axelrod for an article entitled Alan Axelrod, Business Book Juggernaut. Hofman mentioned Axelrod's two top sellers at the time Patton on Leadership and Elizabeth I CEO. He asked Axelrod about the topics of two new books on business ethics and business etiquette. He also asked how Axelrod chose subjects of biographies.

The Kirkus Review of Patton on Leadership describes the book as a "compact but insightful volume" and "concise yet in-depth look at a fascinating man whose myth, in many ways, outshines the facts." The review concludes: "Like Patton at his best: polished, precise and persuasive."

In an article in Huffington Post on April 10, 2012, updated June 10, 2012, Rabbi Alan Lurie quoted Encyclopedia of Wars by Charles Phillips and Alan Axelrod for the identification of only 123 of 1763 wars listed in the book as involving "a religious cause, accounting for less than 7 percent of all wars and less than 2 percent of all people killed in warfare."

Axelrod was quoted several times by John Brandon in the June 7, 2012 article in Popular Mechanics entitled How Assassin's Creed III Re-created the Revolutionary War because Axelrod was the author of The Complete Idiot's Guide to the American Revolution.

Brian Doherty interviewed Axelrod for an article in Reason Online about the use of propaganda to persuade the American public to support intervention in World War I. Axelrod discussed the role of George Creel, head of the Committee on Public Information, formed during Woodrow Wilson's second term in office.

In an article posted online June 30, 2016 and updated September 28, 2016, WFMZ-TV 69 News (Allentown, Pennsylvania), 69News discussed the release of two children's books illustrated by historical artist Mort Kunstler. One of them, "The Revolutionary War 1775-1783," has "text by Alan Axelrod, renowned historian and co-author of the New York Times bestseller, What Every American Should Know About American History."

Jim Michaels interviewed Axelrod for an article in USA Today about the United States Marine Corps at the Battle of Belleau Wood in World War I. The battle proved that the Marines were well trained as a modern fighting force and with skill and courage stopped the Germans from advancing on Paris. Axelrod had written a book about the battle.

Conference speaker 

Axelrod was a featured speaker at the 2004 Conference on Excellence in Government in Washington, DC. He has also been a speaker at the Leadership Institute of Columbia College (South Carolina) in Columbia, South Carolina, and at the 2005 Annual Conference of the Goizueta School of Business, at Emory University in Atlanta, Georgia. He also spoke at the 2014 annual conference of Ecopetrol in Bogota, Colombia.

Publications
 Lost Destiny: Joe Kennedy Jr. and the Doomed WWII Mission to Save London (2015) Palgrave Macmillan 
 Napoleon: CEO (2011) Sterling  (Hardcover),  (ebook)
 Gandhi: CEO (2010) Sterling 
 The Complete Idiot's Guide to the New World Order (2010)
 Miracle at Belleau Wood: The Birth of the Modern U.S. Marine Corps (2010) (Published in hardcover 2007) The Lyons Press 
 The Real History of the Cold War: A New Look at the Past (2009)
 Winston Churchill: CEO (2009)
 
 Selling the Great War: the making of American Propaganda (March 2009)
 Edison on Innovation: 102 Lessons in Creativity for Business and Beyond (2008)
 What Every American Should Know about American History (2008)
 Blooding at Great Meadows: Young George Washington and the Battle That Shaped the Man (2008)
 Profiles in Folly: History's worst decisions and why they went wrong (2008)
 The Complete Idiot's Guide to Astronomy, The Complete Idiot's Guide Series (2008)
 The Real History of World War II: A New Look at the Past (2008)
 
 The Real History of the American Revolution: A new look at the past  (2007)
 The Complete Idiot's Guide to Forensics, The Complete Idiot's Guide Series (2007)
 
 Eisenhower On Leadership: Ike's Enduring Lessons in Total Victory Management, (2006) Jossey-Bass 
 American History ASAP (2003)
 Elizabeth I: CEO (2000) Prentice Hall 
 Patton On Leadership: Strategic Lessons for Corporate Warfare, (1999) Prentice Hall 
 The Complete Idiot's Guide to the American Revolution, The Complete Idiot's Guide Series (1999)
 The Encyclopedia of Wars (1997). co-authored with Charles Phillips
 International Encyclopedia of Secret Societies and Fraternal Orders  New York; Facts on File, 1997
 The War Between the Spies: A History of Espionage During the American Civil War (1992) Atlantic Monthly 
 Chronicle of the Indian Wars: From Colonial Times to Wounded Knee (1990)
 Charles Brockden Brown: An American Tale (1983)
 Lincoln's Last Night: Abraham Lincoln, John Wilkes Booth, and the Last 36 Hours Before the Assassination
 How America Won World War I: The U.S. Military Victory in the Great War - The Causes, The Course and The Consequences. Guilford, Connecticut: Globe Pequot, 2018. .

Television
 The Wild West, as creative consultant.
 Civil War Journal, as creative consultant

Notes

External links

 A Chat with Alan Axelrod, Frank R. Shaw with bibliography to 2004
 Georgia Writers Association entry for Alan Axelrod

20th-century American historians
American male non-fiction writers
Furman University faculty
Historians of the United States
Lake Forest College faculty
Living people
Writers from Atlanta
University of Iowa alumni
1952 births
20th-century American male writers
Historians from Georgia (U.S. state)